A pheromone trap is a type of insect trap that uses pheromones to lure insects. Sex pheromones and aggregating pheromones are the most common types used. A pheromone-impregnated lure, as the red rubber septa in the picture, is encased in a conventional trap such as a bottle trap,  Delta trap, water-pan trap, or funnel trap. Pheromone traps are used both to count insect populations by sampling, and to trap pests such as clothes moths to destroy them.

Sensitivity
Pheromone traps are very sensitive, meaning they attract insects present at very low densities. They are often used to detect presence of exotic pests, or for sampling, monitoring, or to determine the first appearance of a pest in an area. They can be used for legal control, and are used to monitor the success of the Boll Weevil Eradication Program and the spread of the gypsy moth. The high species-specificity of  pheromone traps can also be an advantage, and they tend to be inexpensive and easy to implement. This sensitivity is especially suited to some investigations of invasive species: Flying males are easily blown off course by winds. Rather than introducing noise, Frank et al 2013 find this can actually help detect isolated nests or populations and determine the length of time necessary between introduction and establishment. (Although any trap can answer the same questions, high sensitivity such as provided by pheromone traps does so more accurately.)

However, it is impractical in most cases to completely remove or "trap out" pests using a pheromone trap. Some pheromone-based pest control methods have been successful, usually those designed to protect enclosed areas such as households or storage facilities. There has also been some success in mating disruption. In one form of mating disruption, males are attracted to a powder containing female attractant pheromones. The pheromones stick to the males' bodies, and when they fly off, the pheromones make them attractive to other males. It is hoped that if enough males chase other males instead of females, egg-laying will be severely impeded.

Some difficulties surrounding pheromone traps include sensitivity to bad weather, their ability to attract pests from neighboring areas, and that they generally only attract adults, although it is the juveniles in many species that are pests. They are also generally limited to one sex.

Digital Pheromone Traps 
In recent years, pheromone traps also partook in the digital transformation in agriculture, and agritech companies introduced digital pheromone traps. Also known as Pest Traps, digital pheromone traps are IoT devices that include systems to detect and identify pests in the field. Their main goal is to notice pests and manage pesticide spraying. They involve sticky papers, in-built cameras, and various software systems that enable pest detection and identification. Some pheromone traps such as Doktar's PestTrapp, utilize machine learning technologies to automatize the detection process for farmers and agricultural businesses. Smart farming practices have adapted using Digital Pest Traps as financially beneficial and environmentally friendly tools.

Targets
Though certainly not all insect pheromones have been discovered, many are known and many more are discovered every year. Some sites curate large lists of insect pheromones.  Pheromones are frequently used to monitor and control lepidopteran and coleopteran species, with many available commercially. Pheromones are available for insects including:

African bollworm
African cotton leafworm
Apple brown tortrix
Apple clearwing moth
Apple fruit moth
Apple maggot
Artichoke moth
Asian beetle
Asian corn borer moth
Baluchistan fruit fly
Banana weevil
Banded elm bark beetle
Barred fruit-tree tortrix
Beech tortrix moth
Beet armyworm
Bertha armyworm
Black cutworm
Blueberry maggot
Bollworm
Bright-line brown-eye or tomato moth
Brown oak tortrix
Cabbage leaf roller
Cabbage looper moth
Cabbage moth
Carnation tortrix
Carob moth
Cherry-bark moth
Cherry fruit fly
Citrus cutworm
Citrus flower moth
Citrus leafmining moth
Citrus mealybug
Codling moth
Corn earworm
Corn stalk borer
Cucumber fruit fly
Cucumber moth
Currant clearwing moth
Cutworm
Date palm fruit stalk borer
Diamond back moth
Douglas-fir tussock moth
Dubas bug
Durra stem borer
Eastern cherry fruit fly
Eggplant shoot and fruit borer
Egyptian cotton leaf worm
Engraver beetle
European corn borer
European goat moth
European pine shoot moth
European spruce bark beetle
Eye-spotted bud moth
Fall armyworm
False codling moth
Fruit fly
Fruit tree leaf roller
Garden pebble
Golden leaf roller
Golden twin moth or groundnut semi-looper moth
Grape moth or vine moth
Green oak moth
Grey tortrix
Gypsy moth
Hants moth
Japanese beetle
Jasmine moth
Large fruit tree tortrix
Leche's twist moth
Leek moth or onion moth
Legume pod borer
Leopard moth
Lesser peach tree borer
Longhorn date stem borer
Marbled orchard tortrix
Mediterranean fruit fly
Mediterranean pine engraver beetle
Melon fly
Northern bark beetle
Nun moth
Olive fruit fly
Olive moth
Orange tortrix
Oriental fruit fly
Oriental fruit moth
Pea moth
Peach fruit fly
Pear leaf blister moth
Pear twig borer
Pine processionary moth
Pine sawfly
Pink bollworm
Plum fruit moth
Potato moth
Potato tuber moth
Queensland fruit fly
Quince moth
Red palm weevil
Rhinoceros beetle
Rice stem borer
Rose tortrix
San Jose scale
Sesiidae (some)
Silver Y moth
Six-spined spruce bark beetle
Six-toothed bark beetle
Spiny boll worm
Spotted bollworm
Spotted tentiform miner
Straw coloured tortrix moth
Sugar beet weevil
Summer fruit tortrix moth
Tobacco budworm
Tomato leaf miner
Tomato looper
Turnip moth
Variegated golden tortrix
Winter moth
Xyloterus bark beetle

Gallery

References

Biological pest control
Pest control techniques
Insect ecology
Entomology equipment
Pest trapping
Chemical ecology